Attorney General Robinson may refer to:

Arthur Robinson (Australian politician) (1872–1945), Attorney-General of Victoria
Bryan Robinson (judge) (1808–1887), Attorney-General of Newfoundland Colony
Christopher Robinson (Rhode Island politician) (1806–1889), Attorney General of Rhode Island
Sir John Robinson, 1st Baronet, of Toronto (1791–1863), Attorney General for Upper Canada
Robert Thomson Robinson (1867–1926), Attorney-General of Western Australia

See also
General Robinson (disambiguation)